Medeama Sporting Club is a Ghanaian professional football club based in Tarkwa, Western Region. The club currently competes in the Ghana Premier League.

The club was formerly known as Kessben F.C. before changing its name to Medeama Sporting Club in January 2011. Moses Armah is the President and owner of Medeama SC.

History

Kessben FC 
It was founded in 2002. Its home ground used to be Abrankese Stadium in Abrankese, Ashanti Region, also known as Anane Boateng Stadium between. The club was previously sponsored by Coca-Cola Ghana Ltd.

Medeama SC 
Medeama Football Club was established 2008 as a Ghana Division Three League club. In 2010, the club failed in its initial attempt to qualify to the Ghana Premier League. This led to the purchasing of the now defunct Kessben FC the same year. The licensing of the club was fully completed in December 2010 and club was renamed to Medeama Sporting Club in January 2011. The base of the Kessben club was moved from Abrankese in Ashanti Region of Ghana to Tarkwa in the Western Region of Ghana.

Grounds 
Medeama SC currently play their home matches at Akoon Park located in Tarkwa, Ghana. The stadium currently holds 10,000 people.

Honours
FA Cup
Champions (2): 2013, 2015
Ghana Super Cup
Champions (1): 2015

Current squad
As of 10 October, 2022.

Captains 

 Mohammed Muntari Tagoe 2014–2016
 Joseph Tetteh Zutah 2017–

Management staff 
Chairman
  Moses Armah
Board Chairman
  Dr Anthony Aubynn
Chief executive 
  James Essilfie
Club Solicitor
  Emmanuel Larbi Amoah
Communication Director
  Patrick Akoto

Managerial history

Current coach 

  Ignatius Osei-Fosu (Head coach)
  Charles Anokye Frimpong (Assistant coach)

Previous coaches 

  Hans van der Pluijm (Head coach) 2013–2015
  Tom Strand (Head coach) 2015–2016
  Evans Adotey (Technical Director), (Interim coach) 2013–2017
  Samuel Boadu (Head coach) (2018–2021)
 Yaw Preko (Head coach) (2021)

Supporting staff 
  Hamza Obeng (Assistant coach)
  Eric Amponsah (Goalkeepers coach)
  Joachim Yaw (Assistant coach)

Seasons 
2020–21 Medeama S.C. season

References

External links
 Official website
 Ghana-pedia webpage - Kessben FC

 
Association football clubs established in 2002
2002 establishments in Ghana
Football clubs in Ghana
Association football clubs disestablished in 2010
Sports clubs in Ghana
Western Region (Ghana)